Juvenal Rocha (born 3 May 1948) is a Bolivian long-distance runner. He competed in the marathon at the 1972 Summer Olympics.

References

1948 births
Living people
Athletes (track and field) at the 1972 Summer Olympics
Bolivian male long-distance runners
Bolivian male marathon runners
Olympic athletes of Bolivia
Place of birth missing (living people)